Youth ( [Yunost']; 1857) is the third novel in Leo Tolstoy's autobiographical trilogy, following Childhood and Boyhood. It was first published in the popular Russian literary magazine Sovremennik.

Later in life, Tolstoy expressed his unhappiness with this book and the second in the trilogy, Boyhood.

See also

Leo Tolstoy bibliography

References

External links
 

1857 novels
Russian autobiographical novels
Novels by Leo Tolstoy